Oak Glen Preserve is a Wildlands Conservancy nature preserve consisting of  of land in San Bernardino County, California. It is located in the western foothills of the San Bernardino Mountains.
Key features are the Southern California Montane Botanic Garden and Children's Outdoor Discovery Center.
Los Rios Rancho is California's largest historic apple orchard.
The preserve gets 600,000 visitors per year.

Recreation
Activities include picnicking, hiking and educational programs.

The northern part of the preserve includes Galena Peak (9,324 feet), Wilshire Peak (8,700 feet) and Birch Mountain (7,826 feet).

Los Rios Rancho is Southern California's largest apple orchard in operation since 1906. September through November visitors can pick apples and buy various apple based products like cider and pie.

Botanic Garden
The Southern California Montane Botanic Garden and Children's Outdoor Discovery Center are within the preserve. The garden contains a set of themed venues which are continually added. Within the 220 acres are oak woodlands, conifer forests, chaparral grasslands, redwood and sequoia trees, and two streams.

Geography
Preserve is located in a glen at 5,024 feet, beneath Wilshire Peak (8700').

Flora and fauna
A Canyon live Oak is the largest of its species.
The National Register of Champion Trees states it is 473 inches in circumference, 124 feet in height with a 98-foot crown spread.

There are plans to build a trail to the tree.

History

In 1995, Los Rios Ranch was acquired.

In 2004, most of the orchard was leased for apple growing and entertainment.

In 2014, the Southern California Montane Botanic Garden and Children's Outdoor Discovery Center were opened.

In 2018, pests killed many of the oak trees. The diseased trees had to be removed.

In December 2019, a catastrophic snowstorm devastated trees. Several feet of wet snow caused limbs to fall and hundreds of trees to topple. The damage was compounded because the trees hadn't shed their leaves.  30% of black oaks and many sycamores were lost.

A second snow storm hit in January 2020 causing additional damage. The damage was less severe than the prior storm because the deciduous trees had lost their leaves.

In 2020, three fires impacted the preserve.
The Apple Fire burned to Wilshire Peak. Fire crews protected the champion oak tree.

The El Dorado Fire burned the north side of Oak Glen Preserve.
A third fire destroyed the Los Rios Rancho buildings (bakery, store, packing house) and preserve's ranger shop.

References

External links

Bibliography

Nature reserves in California
Protected areas of San Bernardino County, California